Antoni Stawikowski (born 1933, Poland), first leader of the Polish illegal Solidarity union in Toruń.

Career

Stawikowski was the president of the then-illegal Solidarity union in Toruń from 1981-89, when the union has been proclaimed legal. Together with Ryszard Musielak, Andrzej Tyc, Stanisław Dembiński, Jarosław Zaremba, and others, Stawikowski was one of the crucial  activists fighting with the communists regime in the region of Toruń. During the martial law (1981-1983) held in prison. 

In 1955, he was hired at the Nicolaus Copernicus Astronomical Center of the Polish Academy of Sciences in Toruń (CAMK Toruń). He earned his doctoral degree in 1976. He author of several books on astronomy and cosmology.

Family
He has two daughters, Małgorzata and Anna.

See also
 Solidarity (Polish trade union)
 History of Poland
 Toruń

External links
  Several Leaders of Solidarity Held Over Weekend Are Free - The New York Times (a lot concerns Stawikowski being arrested)
 Nicolaus Copernicus Astronomical Center in Toruń (CAMK Toruń)
 Rotary Club Toruń

1933 births
Living people
People from Toruń
Polish democracy activists
Polish dissidents
Polish trade unionists